Busia District is a district in the Eastern region of Uganda.

Location
Busia District borders Tororo District to the north, Busia County, Kenya to the east, [Namyingo] to the south, and to the south-west, and Bugiri District to the west.

Population
During the 1991 national population census, the population in the district was estimated at 163,600. In 2002, the national census estimated the population at 225,000. In 2012, the mid-year population of was estimated at 297,600.

Notable people
Notable people from Busia District include:

 Aggrey Awori -,Former Uganda Minister of Information Technology (2009-2011)
 Barbara Nekesa Oundo, former state minister for Karamoja affairs and the Busia District women's representative in the parliament (since 2011)
 Benjamin Joseph Odoki, former chief justice of Uganda
 James Munange Ogoola, former principal judge of Uganda
 Denis Onyango, Ugandan international association football goalkeeper
 Gabriel Opio, former minister of gender, culture and labour (2009-2011)
 Fred Wabwire-Mangen, professor of epidemiology, Makerere University School of Public Health
 Erasmus Desiderius Wandera, Roman Catholic bishop, Diocese of Soroti (1980-2007)
 Kevinah Taaka Wanaha Wandera, former Member of Parliament, Busia Municipality (2011-2016)
 Barnabas Nawangwe, Professor of  Architecture and current Vice Chancellor of Makerere University

Points of interest
The following points of interest are in the district:
 Majanji landing site on Lake Victoria for fish, which is one of the main foods in the district.
 Busitema University is a Government University located within the district.

See also
Busia County
Districts of Uganda

References

 
Districts of Uganda
Eastern Region, Uganda
Districts in Uganda